Raymond Aloysius Vonderlehr (25 Apr 1897 – 28 Jan 1973) was the director of the Centers for Disease Control and Prevention from 1947 to 1951. He was also the onsite director on the Tuskegee Experiment from its start until 1943. During his time as director, he deceitfully insinuated that diagnostic and painful lumbar punctures were necessary treatment. He also directed plans to continue the experiment until each subject could be "brought to autopsy" by giving the subjects non-effective treatments such as aspirin so that they would continue to believe the purpose of the study was to find a cure for syphilis. He was also a mentor to Dr. John R. Heller Jr. who would take over his duties at the Tuskegee Experiment after he left.

References

Directors of the Centers for Disease Control and Prevention
Truman administration personnel
People from Richmond, Virginia
University of Virginia School of Medicine alumni
Hampden–Sydney College alumni